Kovachevtsi (also transliterated Kovačevci) may refer to two villages in Bulgaria:

 Kovachevtsi, Pernik Province, the administrative centre of Kovachevtsi Municipality

See also 
 Kovačevci (disambiguation) (Ковачевци)
 Kovachevitsa (Ковачевица; also translit. Kovačevica), a village in Bulgaria
 Kovachevo (disambiguation) (Ковачево; also translit. Kovačevo)
 Kovachev (Ковачев; also translit. Kovačev), a surname
 Kovach (disambiguation) (Ковач; also translit. Kovač)